Marvel's Spider-Man is an 2018 action-adventure game developed by Insomniac Games and published by Sony Interactive Entertainment. Based on the Marvel Comics superhero Spider-Man, it is inspired by the long-running comic book mythology and adaptations in other media. Set in New York City, players follow Spider-Man trying to stop the super-human crime lord Mister Negative from releasing a deadly virus across the city while dealing with the personal problems of his civilian persona, Peter Parker. The game was announced on June 14, 2016; it was widely anticipated. It was nominated for Most Wanted Game at the Golden Joystick Awards in 2016 and 2017, as well as for Most Anticipated Game at The Game Awards 2017.

It was released worldwide on September 7, 2018, for the PlayStation 4. Spider-Man received "generally favorable reviews" from critics, according to review aggregator Metacritic with a score of 87 from 116 reviews; it was Metacritic's thirteenth highest-scoring PlayStation 4 game of 2018. Spider-Man sold 3.3 million units in its first three days of release, making it the fastest-selling second-party video game release in Sony's history, narrowly beating 2018's God of War's 3.1 million. USA Today estimated the game made at least  during this period, surpassing the  North-American opening-weekend box office take of the 2017 film Spider-Man: Homecoming. By November 2018, it became the fastest-selling superhero game in the United States. By August 2019, Spider-Man had sold over 13.2 million physical and digital units worldwide making it one of the best-selling PlayStation 4 games.

Spider-Man garnered awards and nominations in a variety of categories with particular praise for its story, characters, performances, and music. At the Gamers' Choice Awards 2018, the game received eight nominations and went on to win three awards: Fan Favorite Action Game, Fan Favorite Single Player Gaming Experience, and Fan Favorite Character of the Year for Yuri Lowenthal as Peter Parker / Spider-Man. At the National Academy of Video Game Trade Reviewers Awards the game received twenty-one nominations and went on to win three awards for Engineering; Game, Franchise Action; and Performance in a Drama, Supporting for Laura Bailey as Mary Jane Watson. At the 22nd Annual D.I.C.E. Awards, the game earned eleven nominations and won the award for Outstanding Achievement in Animation. At the SXSW Gaming Awards 2019, Spider-Man earned eight nominations and won the Excellence in Animation and Excellence in Convergence awards, and at the Game Critics Awards 2018 it garnered three nominations and won two awards: Best Console Game and Best Action/Adventure Game.

Spider-Man appeared on several lists of the top video games of 2018, being ranked in first place by Wired; second place by Apple Daily and Time; third place by Complex, Push Square, and Zero Punctuation; fifth place by Electronic Gaming Monthly; seventh place by GamesRadar+ and Giant Bomb; ninth place by Polygon and USgamer; and tenth place by The Daily Telegraph. Shacknews and The Verge named it "Game of the Year" and it was nominated for Game of the Year by Eurogamer, GameSpot, and IGN. A poll of 128 Japanese game developers by Famitsu magazine named Spider-Man as their game of the year.

Accolades

Other awards 
Spider-Man received a range of awards and nominations from media publications and other game awards shows.

Best Game awards and nominations 
Spider-Man appeared on several lists of the top video games of 2018, being ranked in first place by Wired; second place by Apple Daily, Hot Press, Maxim, Stuff, Time, and Troy Daily News; third place by Complex, France Info, Igromania, Morning Star, Push Square, The Ringer, and Zero Punctuation; fourth place by Gry Online, The Michigan Daily, National Post, and NRK P3; fifth place by Electronic Gaming Monthly, Libertad Digital, and Vulture; sixth place by IGN Italy and Rolling Stone Italy; seventh place by GamesRadar+, Giant Bomb, Knack Focus, The Mercury News, and The Star; eighth place by HuffPost Brazil; ninth place by Polygon and USgamer; and tenth place by The Daily Telegraph. Shacknews and The Verge named it "Game of the Year" and it was nominated for Game of the Year by CNews, Eurogamer, Fox Sports Asia, GameSpot, IGN, and news.com.au. A poll of 128 Japanese game developers by Famitsu magazine named Spider-Man as their game of the year.

Other categories

Game award shows 
The Australian Games Awards and Brazil Game Awards nominated Marvel's Spider-Man for both Action/Adventure Title of the Year and Game of the Year. The Brazil Game Awards also nominated it for Best Original Game, Best Console Game, Best Soundtrack, Best Voice Acting in Portuguese, and Insomniac was nominated for Best Studio. The Global Game Awards nominated it for Game of the Year (sixth), Best Action (second), Best Open World (third), Best Visuals (fourth), in addition Insomniac won Best Developer. At the New York Game Awards the game was nominated for The Big Apple Award for Best Game of the Year and Laura Bailey's portrayal of Mary Jane Watson gave her a nomination for Great White Way Award for Best Acting in a Game.

The game was nominated for 22 categories and won three at the National Academy of Video Game Trade Reviewers Awards 17 of these were: Game of the Year; Animation, Artistic; Animation, Technical; Art Direction, Contemporary; Camera Direction in a Game Engine; Character Design; Control Design; Costume Design; Design, Franchise; Direction in a Game Cinema; Graphics, Technical; Lighting/Texturing; Original Dramatic Score, Franchise; Sound Editing in a Game Cinema; Sound Effects; Writing in a Drama. In addition, it won the awards for Game, Franchise Action and Engineering. Also it received nominations for its voice actors including: Performance in a Drama, Lead (Yuri Lowenthal as Peter Parker / Spider-Man); Performance in a Drama, Supporting (Laura Bailey as Mary Jane Watson); Performance in a Drama, Supporting (William Saylers as Otto Octavius / Doctor Octopus). Bailey went on to win her nomination.

Media publications 
It received a "Silver" award (equivalent to third place) by PlayStation Blog in the following categories: Best Narrative, Best Graphical Showcase, Best Sound Design, Best Soundtrack, Best Performance, Best PlayStation 4 Game. It also received a "Gold" award (equivalent to second place) by PlayStation Blog for Best PlayStation Console Exclusive. Its developer, Insomniac Games, received a "Silver" award for Studio of the Year.

Spider-Man won Best Game Narrative from Digital Trends and was nominated for Best Story by Giant Bomb. Additionally, it was nominated for Best Video Game Story as well as Best PlayStation 4 Game and Best Action-Adventure Game by IGN. It was a runner-up in four categories by IGN Australia these are: Best Audio Design, Best Game Design, Best Storytelling, and Game of the Year. It was nominated for four awards by The Games Machine these are: Best Action Game, Best Open World, Game of the Year, Tell Me a Story. It won the award for Best Action/Adventure Game by Inner Circle Games Network. It won an Excellence Prize from Famitsu Awards.

Notes

References

Bibliography

External links
 

Spider-Man, Marvel's
Accolades
Accolades